Rajaei (also spelled Rajaee, Rajai, or Recai (Turkish)) is a given name and surname, it may refer to:

Given name
 Cingöz Recai, Turkish fictional character
 Recai Kutan, Turkish politician
 Rajai Davis, American baseball player for the New York Mets

Surname
 Alireza Rajaei, Iranian journalist
 Mohammad-Ali Rajai, Iranian politician

Places
 Shahid Rajaee Dam, dam in Mazandaran Province, Iran
 Shahid Rajaei Stadium, multi-use stadium in Qazvin, Iran
 Shahid Rajaee University, public university in Tehran, Iran

See also
Shahid Rajai (disambiguation)
 Razai, quilt of India, Pakistan and Afghanistan

Arabic masculine given names
Iranian-language surnames
Turkish masculine given names

de:Recai